Succinyl-coenzyme A, abbreviated as succinyl-CoA or SucCoA, is a thioester of succinic acid and coenzyme A.

Sources
It is an important intermediate in the citric acid cycle, where it is synthesized from α-ketoglutarate by α-ketoglutarate dehydrogenase through decarboxylation. During the process, coenzyme A is added.

With B12 as an enzymatic cofactor, it is also synthesized from propionyl CoA, the odd-numbered fatty acid, which cannot undergo beta-oxidation. Propionyl-CoA is carboxylated to D-methylmalonyl-CoA, isomerized to L-methylmalonyl-CoA, and rearranged to yield succinyl-CoA via a vitamin B12-dependent enzyme. While Succinyl-CoA is an intermediate of the citric acid cycle, it cannot be readily incorporated there because there is no net consumption of Succinyl-CoA. Succinyl-CoA is first converted to malate, and then to pyruvate where it is then transported to the matrix to enter the citric acid cycle.

Fate
It is converted into succinate through the hydrolytic release of coenzyme A by succinyl-CoA synthetase (succinate thiokinase).

Another fate of succinyl-CoA is porphyrin synthesis, where succinyl-CoA and glycine are combined by ALA synthase to form δ-aminolevulinic acid (dALA). This process is the committed step in the biosynthesis of porfobilinogen and thus hemoglobin.

Formation
Succinyl CoA can be formed from methylmalonyl CoA through the utilization of deoxyadenosyl-B12 (deoxyadenosylcobalamin) by the enzyme methylmalonyl-CoA mutase.  This reaction, which requires vitamin B12 as a cofactor, is important in the catabolism of some branched-chain amino acids as well as odd-chain fatty acids.

Interactive pathway map

References

Thioesters of coenzyme A
Citric acid cycle compounds